Emperatriz Carvajal (born in Chile; died in Mexico) was a Chilean actress and singer who worked extensively in Argentina and Mexico.

Filmography

External links

20th-century Chilean women singers
Chilean film actresses
Chilean stage actresses
Chilean expatriates in Argentina
Chilean expatriates in Mexico